The Marca's marmoset (Mico marcai) is a species of marmoset that is endemic to the Amazon, in the Aripuanã-Manicoré interfluvium in Brazil. Its body is light grey, with orange legs, a black tail, a pinkish face, and naked ears.

It was previously thought to be virtually unknown; in 2008 the IUCN noted that it had never been seen in the wild, though it has been observed since then. However, later studies found the Manicore marmoset (Mico manicorensis), discovered in the Campos Amazônicos National Park in 2000, to be conspecific with M. marcai, and thus both were synonymized.

References

Mico (genus)
Mammals of Brazil
Endemic fauna of Brazil
Mammals described in 1993